Incheon National University (INU), previously also known as University of Incheon (UI), is a national university, operated by the legal entity (법인, 法人) established by the Government of the Republic of Korea, aiming for a world-class flagship university in the city of Incheon, part of Seoul Capital Area. 

INU stands in the new and young international city of Songdo which is also known as the New Songdo City, located in IFEZ (Incheon Free Economic Zone). The university operates multiple campuses across Incheon metropolitan area at Songdo, main campus, and also at Michuhol and Dohwa-dong, satellite campuses. INU has been reputed as one of the most innovative universities in the world, ranked 26th in the world, and 2nd in South Korea just next to Seoul National University from 2021 World Universities of Real Impact (WURI) ranking.  INU's Matrix College system is recognized as one of the most efficient ways to bridge academia and industry, preparing students for immediate impact to the respective field after graduation. INU is also one of the leading universities for student start-up establishment and support, partly owing to national industrial park nearby (Namdong Induspark) and bio-cluster established in Songdo.

Brief history

INU was first founded as a private college known as the Incheon Technical College in January 1979 as a part of Sunin Academy. Later, it was renamed Incheon College in December 1979 before getting chartered as a comprehensive university in 1988. In 1994, the university was renamed once again to University of Incheon, which was a city council funded university. In addition to these changes, INU also relocated from Dohwa-dong in Nam-gu to a new location in 2009. A year later, in 2010, INU merged with Incheon City College to expand capacity and open more curricula.
In February 2009, Incheon Institute for Korean Language Studies was opened. Also In 2009 Jul, construction of Sondgo campus (Main Campus) was completed. In 2010, the university merged with Incheon City College. As a result, many new departments were opened with larger student capacities.
In February 2013, the university was nationalized and renamed as Incheon National University. INU is regarded as the epitome of democratization of educational institutions in South Korea, resisting the influence of internal and external political pressure on academic and governmental freedom along the history of the university.

Relocation and new campus

INU relocated from Dohwa-dong in Namgu to new location in 2009. Now, UI stands in the new and young international city of Songdo, the core sector and the most anticipated investment of IFEZ (Incheon Free Economic Zone). 

It has further plans for a new campus to hold R&D centers and branches of international universities such as Ghent in Belgium, Lawrence Berkeley National Laboratory in the US, St. Petersburg in Russia and Plymouth in the UK. The city council plans for Songdo, the core sector of Incheon Free Economic Zone  (IFEZ), to hold branches of many Korean universities and of foreign universities in the Global Campus facility.

Academics

Undergraduate schools
UI's 65 academic departments and programs are organized into 11 colleges and schools.

Graduate schools
Established on November 27, 1984, the Graduate School currently includes 35 masters and 28 doctoral degree programs.

Ranking
 4th national university in Korea from 2022 JoongAng Ilbo university ranking (Overall category).
 3rd for creating and supporting start-up from  2022 JoongAng Ilbo university ranking (Student start-up category).
 26th most innovative university in the world, and 2nd in South Korea from 2021 World Universities of Real Impact (WURI) ranking.  
 1st for creating student-driven start-ups among national universities and 8th among all universities in Korea from 2020 Korea Economic Daily.

Office of International Affairs and Korean Language Institute
The Office of International Affairs provides opportunities to learn through Student Exchange Program, Short-term language training programs globalizing the university through expanding sister relationships with the universities whole over the world. Web site of Office of International

The Korean language program was founded for the purpose of teaching the Korean language to foreigners and Korean students from overseas. The Incheon Institute for Korean Language Studies focuses on the linguistic abilities of speaking, listening, reading, and writing and offers opportunities to experience a taste of Korean history, culture, and society together with the Korean language.
The institute consists of certified teachers with graduate school education and vital experience teaching. Students from over the world, including China, Mongolia, Thailand, Canada, and The United States, are currently registered for classes and are studying the Korean language.

Confucius Institute
Confucius Institute at Incheon National University is supported by the Chinese government. The Chinese government has been supporting language institutes around the world for the spread of the Chinese language and culture. In Korea, the Chinese government has selected Incheon National University and has given support in the established of a Confucius Institute. The educated curriculum receives academic guidance of the Chinese Education Ministry.

Industry-Academy Cooperation Foundation
The Industry-Academy Cooperation Foundation (IACF) of Incheon National University was established in May 2004 as a special corporation. Its purpose is to collaborate with industry in cultivation human resources with creative minds, promoting industry-oriented education and to develop new knowledge and technology for the improvement of industry, and with the profits from intellectual property to provide financial assistance for education and research.

INU Holdings
INU Holdings is a technology holdings company which deals with technologies developed by students and professors of Incheon National University. So far, INU Holdings is the 6th technology holdings company of a university in Korea. It was opened last year and so far has established 3 subsidiary companies. It has strong cooperation with the IACF.

Green Pioneer Co.
Green Pioneer started as a spin-off company established by a professor of biology in UI with the support from school. Now, it is a subsidiary company of INU Holdings. Its key business facets are distribution of photosynthesis assessment instruments  (PAM) and biokits. It also obtains an ISO listed technology in the field of toxicology.

Notable people

Kim Kyo-Heung, politician, Member of Parliament, Secretary General of the National Assembly 
Bae Jin-Gyo, politician, Member of Parliament
Lee Dong-Joo, politician, Member of Parliament
Park Chang-kyu, politician, Incheon Metroplitan City Council
Che Sun-Joo, business woman, CCO, Naver
Joo Jin-mo, actor
Jung Suk-won, actor
Sunwoo Sun, actress
Kim Da-Mi, actress
Lee Sun-hee, singer
Lee So-Ra, singer
Jang Min-hee, sports archer, 2020 Tokyo Olympic Gold medallist
More list of INU alumni can be found here

See also
List of national universities in South Korea
List of universities and colleges in South Korea
Education in Korea

References

External links
Official Website 

 
National universities and colleges in South Korea
Universities and colleges in Incheon
Songdo International Business District